Thomas Allen may refer to:

Clergy
Thomas Allen (nonconformist) (1608–1673), Anglican/nonconformist priest in England and New England
Thomas Allen (Dean of Chester) (died 1732)
Thomas Allen (scholar) (1681–1755), Anglican priest in England
Thomas Allen (Manx author) (1710–1754), Vicar of Maughold Parish and author of Manx carols
Thomas M. Allen (Missouri clergyman) (1797–1871), minister of the Disciples of Christ church
Thomas Allen (Dean of Achonry) (1873–1927)
Thomas Allen (chaplain), American Revolution chaplain

Music
Thomas S. Allen (1876–1919), American composer
Sir Thomas Allen (baritone) (born 1944), British baritone singer
Tom Allen (broadcaster) (born 1964), trombonist and radio broadcaster for the Canadian Broadcasting Corporation

Politicians
Thomas Allen (Cavalier) (1603–1681), English MP for Middlesex
Sir Thomas Allen, 1st Baronet (c. 1633–1690), Lord Mayor of London
Tom Allen (Maine politician) (born 1945), U.S. Representative for Maine
Thomas Allen (representative) (1813–1882), railroadman and United States Congressman
Thomas Allen (Wisconsin politician) (1825–1905), ninth Secretary of State of Wisconsin
Thomas Newton Allen (1839–after 1909), lawyer and author in Kentucky and Washington
Thomas Carleton Allen (1852–1927), Canadian attorney and mayor of Fredericton
Thomas R. Allen (born 1965), Chicago alderman
Thomas M. Allen (Georgia politician), Baptist preacher and representative in the Georgia Assembly
Thomas Y. Allen, member of the Virginia House of Delegates

Sport
Tom Allen (boxer) (1840–1904), heavyweight boxing champion
Tom Allen (cricketer) (1912–1954), Australian cricketer
Tom Allen (hurler) (1874–1952), Irish hurler
Tommy Allen (footballer, born 1897) (1897–1968), English footballer
Tom Allen (Australian footballer) (born 1930), former Australian rules footballer
Thomas Allen (sport shooter) (born 1953), Irish sports shooter
Tom Allen (American football) (born 1970), American football coach
Thomas Allen (basketball) (born 1998), American college basketball player

Other people
Thomas Allen (mathematician) (1542–1632), English mathematician
Sir Thomas Allin, 1st Baronet (1612–1685), officer of the Royal Navy, sometimes known as Thomas Allen
Thomas Allen (topographer) (1803–1833), English topographer
Thomas Allen (captain) (1816–1885), South Australian sea captain
Thomas A. Cullinan (1838–1904), law enforcement officer in Kansas
Thomas Allen (Irish Volunteer) (died 1916), member of the Irish Volunteers who fought and died in 1916 Easter Rising in Ireland
Thomas B. Allen (painter) (1928–2004), illustrator
Thomas B. Allen (author) (1929–2018), author and historian
Thomas J. Allen (1931–2020), MIT professor, economist
Tom Allen (comedian) (born 1983), English comedian
Thomas D. Allen (fl. 1992), Scout
Thomas William Allen (1862–1950), English classicist

Other uses
Thomas Allen & Son Limited, a Canadian book distributor

See also
Allen (surname)
Thomas Allan (mineralogist) (1777–1833), Scottish mineralogist
Thomas Allan (disambiguation)
Tommy Allen (disambiguation)
Thomas Alleyn (disambiguation)
Thomas Allin (disambiguation)